Levko Revutsky award is an award to honor young composers and performers for the creation, stage and concert embodiment of outstanding musical works that have gained wide public recognition. It is named after the composer Levko Revutsky.

It was founded by resolutions of the Council of Ministers of the USSR № 290 (May 20, 1982) and № 356 (October 30, 1987).

Recipients 

 Viktor Stepurko (1989)
 Victoria Poleva (1995)
 Svyatoslav Lunyov (1997)
 Ivan Taranenko (1999)
 Bohdana Frolyak (2000)
 Alla Zahaikevych (2001)
 Ivan Nebesnyy (2002)
 Zoltan Almashi (2003)
 Bohdan Sehin (2004)
 Bohdan Kryvopust (2005) 
 Ostap Manulyak (2010)

Links
 Regulations, approval by Ministry of Culture of Ukraine
 Revutsky award, information by Ministry of Culture of Ukraine

References 

Ukrainian music awards